James Bailey may refer to:

People

Academics
 James Bailey (classical scholar) (died 1864), English schoolmaster
 J. O. Bailey (1903–1979), professor of literature
 Jay Bailey (James E. Bailey, 1944–2001), American biochemical engineer and pioneer of metabolic engineering
 James R. Bailey, professor at George Washington University

Politicians
 James Bailey (American politician) (1801–1880), mayor of Houston, Texas
 James E. Bailey (1822–1885), US Senator from Tennessee
 James Bailey (British politician) (1840–1910), British Conservative Party politician, MP 1895–1906

Sports
 James Bailey (basketball) (born 1957), American basketball player
 James Bailey (darts player) (born 1969), Australian darts player
 James Bailey (rugby union) (born 1983), English rugby player
 James Bailey (footballer) (born 1988), English footballer
 James Bailey (field hockey) (born 1991), English field hockey player

Others
 James Montgomery Bailey (1841–1894), American journalist
 James Anthony Bailey (1847–1906), co-founder of Ringling Brothers and Barnum and Bailey Circus
 James E. Bailey (Medal of Honor) (fl. 1872–1875), recipient during the Indian Wars
 James R. A. Bailey (1919–2000), founder and editor of Drum magazine
 James Bailey (businessman) (fl. 2020), British businessman, CEO of Waitrose
 James Thomas Bailey, founder of ComedySportz Los Angeles
 James Bailey, veterinary anesthesiologist, on the Animal Planet show Emergency Vets

Fictional characters
 James Bailey (Coronation Street), from British soap opera Coronation Street

See also
 Jim Bailey (disambiguation)
 Jimmy James Bailey (born 1954), Honduran footballer
 James Bayley (disambiguation)
 James Baillie (disambiguation)
 James Bailie (1890–1967), Northern Irish unionist politician
 James Baily (born 1975), British tennis player